The MT:S Open powered by Sony Ericsson (known until 2009 as the GEMAX Open) and now known as the Serbia Challenger Open is a professional tennis tournament played on outdoor clay courts. It is part of the ATP Challenger Tour and the Challenger series of the WTA Tour. It was held annually at the Tennis Club Gemax until 2010 before its relocation to the Novak Tennis Centre since 2021 in Belgrade, Serbia. The tournament was first played in 2002. The women's edition started in 2021.

Past finals

Men's singles

Women's singles

Men's doubles

Women's doubles

External links
 
 ITF search 

 
ATP Challenger Tour
Tretorn SERIE+ tournaments
Clay court tennis tournaments
Tennis tournaments in Serbia
Tennis tournaments in Serbia and Montenegro
Sport in Belgrade